Shinji Hazawa (born 12 April 1999) is a Japanese tennis player.

Hazawa has a career high ATP singles ranking of 514 achieved on 14 January 2019. He also has a career high doubles ranking of 501 achieved on 7 November 2022.

Hazawa has won 1 ATP Challenger doubles title at the 2022 Kobe Challenger with Yuta Shimizu.

Tour finals

Doubles

References

External links
 
 

1999 births
Living people
Japanese male tennis players
Sportspeople from Hyōgo Prefecture
21st-century Japanese people